Caterina Anguissola Trivulzio (Piacenza, 1508 circa – Castel Goffredo, December 13, 1550) was an Italian noblewoman.

Biography 
She was the daughter of Gian Giacomo Anguissola, of the line of Vigolzone, Count of Piacenza, and of Angela Radini Tedeschi.

Widow of Count Andrea Borgo (or Burgo) of Cremona (1467-1533), Count of Castelleone, in December 1540, she married Aloisio Gonzaga, Lord of Castel Goffredo. After his death in 1549, Caterina governed, through Giovanni Anguissola, the marquisate of Castel Goffredo, until the investiture of her son Alfonso in 1565. Her beauty was exalted by humanist Lodovico Domenichi in his work La Nobiltà delle Donne.

She died in Castel Goffredo in 1550 and was buried in the mausoleum of the Gonzaga family in Chiesa di Santa Maria del Consorzio.

Issue 
Aloisio and Caterina had three children:

 Alfonso (1541 – 1592), second Marquis of Castel Goffredo;
 Ferrante (1544 – 1586), first Marquis of Castiglione;
 Orazio (1545– 1587), Marquis of Solferino.

Lineage

References

Bibliography
 

1508 births
1550 deaths
People from Piacenza